Howard Schatz (born 1940) is an American photographer, who previously had a career as an ophthalmologist.

Life and work

Ophthalmology
Schatz began his professional life in medicine. He completed his medical degree at The University of Illinois College of Medicine, followed by an internship at Cook County Hospital in Chicago, ophthalmology residency at The University of Illinois Eye and Ear Infirmary, and fellowship in vitreoretinal diseases at Johns Hopkins Hospital.

Schatz had a private practice in San Francisco from 1970 to 1995. He was a Clinical Professor of Ophthalmology at the University of California, San Francisco, and a retina specialist.

Photography
His work has included nudes and portraits of a range of people including athletes, actors, and the homeless.

Personal life
Schatz is married to Beverly Ornstein, the former head of Current Affairs at PBS television station, KQED, in San Francisco; she is currently executive producer for Schatz Ornstein Studio. They live and work in Connecticut and New York.

Publications

As Howard Schatz and Beverly Ornstein
1992: Gifted Woman
1993: Seeing Red: The Rapture of Redheads
1994: Homeless: Portraits of Americans in Hard Times
1995: Newborn
1995: WaterDance
1996: The Princess of the Spring and the Queen of the Sea
1996: BodyType
1997: Passion & Line
1998: Pool Light
2000: Bodyknots 
2000: NudeBodyNude
2002: Rare Creatures
2002: Athlete
2005: Botanica
2006: In Character: Actors Acting. Bulfinch. . With a foreword by Roger Ebert.
2007: H2O
2011: With Child
2012: At The Fights
2013: Caught In The Act: Actors Acting
2015: Schatz Images: 25 Years
2018: Kink. New York: Lawrence Richard. .

With others
1996: Virtuoso. 1996. By Ken Carbone with photographs by Schatz.

References

External links
 
 Select works at Gallery M

1940 births
Living people
American ophthalmologists
Photographers from New York (state)
Underwater photographers
Date of birth missing (living people)